Ivanir is a Jewish surname. Notable people with the surname include:

Mark Ivanir (born 1968), Ukrainian-born Israeli actor
Motti Ivanir (born 1964), Israeli footballer and manager

Hebrew-language surnames